Patricia Molly "Pat" Walkden-Pretorius (born 12 February 1946) is a former female tennis player from Rhodesia and South Africa.

Walkden was a runner-up in the 1967 French Championships doubles, partnering compatriot Annette du Plooy. They lost the final in straight sets to Françoise Dürr and Gail Sherriff.

Her best singles result at a Grand Slam tournament was reaching the fourth round at the 1967 French Championships, the 1968 French Open and the 1969 Wimbledon Championships.

She played for the Rhodesian and South African Fed Cup teams in 15 ties between 1966 and 1974 comprising a record of 17 wins and 11 losses. She was part of the South African team, together with Brenda Kirk and Greta Delport, that won the Federation Cup in 1972 after a victory in the final over Great Britain at Ellis Park in Johannesburg, South Africa.

Career finals

Singles: 3 (3 runner-ups)

Doubles: 13 (3 titles, 10 runner-ups)

References

External links 
 
 
 
 

1946 births
South African female tennis players
Zimbabwean female tennis players
Living people
Sportspeople from Bulawayo
White South African people
Rhodesian emigrants to South Africa